Kalan (also Romanized as Kalān) is a village in Kalan Rural District, Zarneh District, Eyvan County, Ilam Province, Iran. At the 2006 census, its population was 536, in 108 families. The village is populated by Kurds.

References 

Populated places in Eyvan County
Kurdish settlements in Ilam Province